{{Speciesbox
| image = Encyocratella_olivacea.jpg
| taxon = Encyocratella olivacea
| parent_authority = Strand, 1907
| authority = Strand, 1907
| synonyms = 
Xenodendrophila Gallon, 2003<ref name=Gall2005>{{cite journal| last=Gallon| first=R. C.| year=2005| title=Encyocratella olivacea Strand, 1907, a senior synonym of Xenodendrophila gabrieli Gallon, 2003 (Araneae: Theraphosidae: Stromatopelminae) with a description of the male| journal=Zootaxa| volume=1003| page=46| doi=10.11646/zootaxa.1003.1.3}}</ref>
| synonyms_ref = 
}}Encyocratella is a monotypic genus of Tanzanian tarantulas (family Theraphosidae) containing the single species, Encyocratella olivacea, also known as the Tanzanian black and olive baboon spider. It was first described by Embrik Strand in 1907, and is found in Tanzania.

 Description 
They are one of two tarantulas which females do not have a spermatheca, instead opting for oviducts and uterus externus. Its carapace is a golden color, with a golden opisthosoma with a black fishbone pattern and spotting. The femur is a deep black color, with the rest of the legs being golden as most of the rest of the body.

 Habitat 
They are found in the rainforests on the southern slopes of mount Meru in the Arusha Region. The average temperature is 19ºC, with average yearly rainfall of 1400mm. They are usually found 2200 m above sea level, a region that is home to plants such as Juniperus, Lobelia and Sedum''.

Behavior 
They are arboreal in nature, but also show burrowing tendencies, so they are sometimes confused as such. Most will try to flee at first, but persistent provocation may result in a bite or a threat pose. Their bite might be painful, as they probably have medically significant venom.

See also
 List of Theraphosidae species

References

Endemic fauna of Tanzania
Monotypic Theraphosidae genera
Spiders of Africa
Taxa named by Embrik Strand
Theraphosidae